HMS Llandaff was a  or Type 61 aircraft direction frigate of the British Royal Navy, named after the district of Llandaff in Cardiff, Wales. She was built by Hawthorn Leslie and Company at Hebburn on the River Tyne, being laid down on 27 August 1953 and launched on 30 November 1955.

Construction
Llandaff was one of three Salisbury-class frigates ordered on 28 June 1951 as a follow-on to the name ship of the class. She was laid down at Hawthorn Leslie's Hebburn shipyard on 27 August 1953, She was launched by Countess Mountbatten, the wife of Earl Louis Mounbatten, on 30 November 1955. Llandaff broke away from her moorings in a storm on 1 March 1956 and was damaged by collisions with the cruiser , the frigate  and a merchant ship before she could be brought under control. Despite this damage, she completed and was accepted into service on 11 April 1958.

Royal Navy service
On entry to service Llandaff was the first ship to be trained by the newly established Flag Officer Sea Training organisation at Portland.

She re-commissioned for the 5th time at Singapore in 1967 and returned to UK waters in September 1968, completing the commission at Devonport in 1970.

Between June and September 1968, Llandaff was in transit from Singapore to the United Kingdom.  Her trip home was a 'showing the flag' voyage via the Solomon Islands, Cairns (Australia), Auckland (New Zealand), Fiji, Rotuma, the Gilbert Islands, Honolulu, Monterey (USA), Long Beach for refuelling, transit through the Panama Canal then Barbados with a short stop in Azores for refuelling, then home to Devonport.

Bangladesh Navy service

Llandaff was sold to the Bangladeshi Navy on 10 December 1976 and was renamed Umar Farooq. Umar Farooq was converted into a training ship where officers under-training and sailors get sea time. During her long refit, a female officers' gunroom and heads were installed so that female officers under-training can also be accommodated. In the Bangladesh Navy she undertook flag-showing and training visits abroad, notable among them the goodwill visit to India, Pakistan and Maldives in 1989, participation in the Korean International Fleet Review in 1998 and the 2014 search for Malaysia Airlines Flight 370. With three other frigates she formed the 7th Frigate Squadron and was stationed in Chittagong, Bangladesh. In 2016 she was sold for scrapping.

References

Publications

External links
 HMS Llandaff association

 

Salisbury-class frigates
1955 ships